Alberto González may refer to:
 Alberto González Domínguez (1904–1982), Argentine mathematician
 Alberto González Gonzalito (born 1922), Paraguayan footballer defender
 Alberto González (humorist) (1928–2012), Cuban humorist and iconoclast
 Alberto Mario González (1941–2023), Argentine football forward
 Alberto González (sailor) (born 1958), Chilean Olympic sailor
 Alberto González (fencer) (born 1972), Argentine fencer
 Alberto Jose González (born 1972), Spanish video game graphic artist, music composer and designer
 Alberto González (footballer, born 1983), Spanish football defender
 Alberto González (baseball) (born 1983), Venezuelan baseball player
 Alberto González (footballer, born 1996), Spanish football goalkeeper
 Alberto González (hammer thrower) (born 1998), Spanish athlete competing in hammer throw

See also
 Albert Gonzalez (born 1981), American computer hacker, and computer criminal
 Alberto Gonzales (born 1955), 80th Attorney General of the United States